Jackson is an unincorporated community in Susquehanna County, Pennsylvania, United States. Jackson has a post office with ZIP code 18825.

References

Unincorporated communities in Susquehanna County, Pennsylvania
Unincorporated communities in Pennsylvania